Cossulus lena is a moth in the family Cossidae. It is found in Turkey.

References

Natural History Museum Lepidoptera generic names catalog

Moths described in 2008
Cossinae
Moths of Asia